Frank Bungay (born 23 March 1905, date of death unknown) was a professional footballer, who played for Huddersfield Town, & Southend United. He was born in Sheffield.

References

1905 births
Year of death missing
Footballers from Sheffield
English footballers
Association football forwards
English Football League players
Huddersfield Town A.F.C. players
Southend United F.C. players